Street Talk is Steve Perry's first solo studio album, released in April 1984.

Street Talk contains Perry's biggest hit as a solo artist, "Oh Sherrie", written for his then-girlfriend Sherrie Swafford.  The song hit #3 on the Billboard Hot 100 and #1 on Billboard's Rock chart, and the accompanying music video (also featuring Swafford) was a hit on MTV. Other singles included "Foolish Heart" (peaked at #18), "She's Mine" (peaked at #21), and "Strung Out" (peaked at #40).

There were a number of nods to Perry's pre-Journey band Alien Project on this album—in fact, that band was originally going to be called Street Talk. In the liner notes, Perry dedicates the album to Richard Michaels (the bassist for Alien Project). Also, drummer Craig Krampf was a member of Alien Project later in the 1970s.

In addition to launching Perry's solo career, the cover photo for Street Talk served as a career launchpad for music photographer John Scarpati, who met Perry during the album's recording sessions at a studio in Sherman Oaks.

Street Talk is certified as 2× Platinum (2,000,000) in sales by the RIAA.

Track listing

Charts

Personnel 
 Steve Perry – lead vocals, backing vocals (1, 2, 3, 5, 7, 9, 10)
 Bill Cuomo – synthesizers (1, 4, 5, 7, 8, 9), acoustic piano (2), synth bells (2), keyboards (3, 6), synth solo (3)
 Randy Goodrum – Rhodes (1-6, 9), drum programming (4)
 Duane Hitchings – synthesizers (8)
 Steve Goldstein – keyboards (10)
 Sterling Smith – keyboards (10)
 Michael Landau – guitar (1-5, 7), guitar solo (6, 9)
 Waddy Wachtel – guitar solo (1), rhythm guitar solo (5)
 Craig Hull – guitar (8, 10)
 Billy Steele – guitar (10)
 Bob Glaub – bass guitar (1-7, 9)
 Chuck Domanico – string bass (3)
 Kevin McCormick – bass guitar (8)
 Bryan Garofalo – bass guitar (10)
 Larrie Londin – drums (1, 2, 3, 5, 6, 7, 9), percussion (1, 2, 3, 7)
 Craig Krampf – drums (8, 10)
 Robert Greenridge – steel drums (5)
 Steve Douglas – saxophone solo (2), tenor saxophone (6)

Production 
 Steve Perry – producer, cover concept
 Bruce Botnick – executive producer 
 Niko Bolas – recording, mixing 
 Richard Bosworth – recording assistant, additional engineer 
 Denny Densmore – recording assistant (10)
 Mike Reese – mastering at The Mastering Lab (Hollywood, California).
 Jim Welch – art direction 
 John Scarpati – cover photography 
 Herbie Herbert – personal management

References

"Street Talk" (Liner Notes); Steve Perry CD, Columbia Records 1984.

External links
"Street Talk" at discogs

1984 debut albums
Steve Perry albums
Albums produced by Bruce Botnick
Columbia Records albums